This is a list of Israel's ambassadors to Serbia and its predecessor countries. The ambassadors are based in Belgrade.

List of Ambassadors 
 Ambassadors to Serbia
 Alona Fisher-Kamm (2016– ),
 Yossef Levy (2011–2016)
 Arthur Koll (2007–2011)
 Yaffa Ben-Ari (2006–2007)

 Ambassadors to Serbia and Montenegro
 Yaffa Ben-Ari (2003–2006)
 Yoram Shani (2003)

 Ambassadors to the Federal Republic of Yugoslavia
 Yoram Shani (2000–2003)

 Ministers to the Socialist Federal Republic of Yugoslavia
 Avigdor Dagan (1965–1967)
 Avraham Kidron (1963–1965)
 Aviezer Chelouche (1961–1963)
 Avraham Darom (1957–1960)
 Arye Levavi (1954–1957)
 Moshe Ishai (1951)

References 

Serbia
Israel